James Walter "Stoke" Doran (August 12, 1884 – July 13, 1927) was a Canadian professional ice hockey player. He played with the Cobalt Silver Kings of the National Hockey Association.

References

1884 births
1927 deaths
Canadian ice hockey defencemen
Cobalt Silver Kings players
Ice hockey people from Ontario
People from the United Counties of Stormont, Dundas and Glengarry